Emperor Duy Tân (lit. "renovation"; 19 September 1900 – 26 December 1945), born Nguyễn Phúc Vĩnh San, was the 11th emperor of the Nguyễn dynasty in Vietnam, who reigned for nine years between 1907 and 1916.

Early childhood
Duy Tân (at the time, known by his birth name, Prince Nguyễn Phúc Vĩnh San) was son of the Thành Thái emperor. Because of his opposition to French rule and his erratic, depraved actions (which some speculate were feigned to shield his opposition from the French) Thành Thái was declared insane and exiled to Vũng Tàu in 1907. The French decided to pass the throne to his son Nguyễn Phúc Vĩnh San, despite the fact that he was only seven years old. The French hoped that someone so young would be easily influenced and controlled, and thus raised to be pro-French.

Reign, 1906–1916
The efforts on the part of the French to raise the prince to support them largely failed. Nguyễn Phúc Vĩnh San was enthroned with the reign name of Duy Tân, meaning "friend of reform", but in time he proved incapable of living up to this name. As he became older he noticed that, even though he was treated as the emperor, it was the colonial authorities who were actually obeyed. As he became a teenager, Emperor Duy Tân came under the influence of the mandarin Trần Cao Vân, who was very much opposed to the colonial administration. Emperor Duy Tân began to plan a secret rebellion with Trần Cao Vân and others to overthrow the French.

In 1916, while France was preoccupied with fighting World War I, Emperor Duy Tân was smuggled out of the Forbidden City with Trần Cao Vân to call upon the people to rise up against the French. However, the secret was revealed, and France immediately sent troops there, and after only a few days, they were betrayed and captured by the French authorities. Because of his age and to avoid a worse situation, Emperor Duy Tân was deposed and exiled instead of being killed. Trần Cao Vân and the rest of the revolutionaries were all beheaded.

Life in exile

The former emperor was exiled with his father (Thành Thái) to Réunion Island in the Indian Ocean. Prince Vĩnh San continued to favor national liberation for Vietnam in exile.

World War II service and death
He then joined the Free French army as a second lieutenant in December 1942, receiving successive promotions to lieutenant (1943), captain (1944), major (July 1945) and lieutenant-colonel (September 1945).

When France was facing defeat by the Viet Minh, and the regime of Emperor Bảo Đại proved incapable of gaining any public support, French leader Charles de Gaulle talked to Prince Vĩnh San, who was still very popular in the Vietnamese public memory for his patriotism, about returning to Vietnam as emperor. However, he died in a plane crash in Central Africa on his way home to Vietnam in 1945 and the great hopes of many died with him – as a patriotic challenge to Hồ Chí Minh. For his wartime service, the French posthumously awarded him the Grand Cross of the Legion of Honour and the Officer's Médaille de la Résistance, also appointing him a Companion of the Ordre de la Libération.

Reburial in Vietnam
In 1987, his son, Prince Bảo Vàng, and the royal family of Vietnam accompanied his father's remains, which were removed from Africa and brought home to Vietnam in a traditional ceremony to rest in the tomb of his grandfather, Emperor Dục Đức. In 2001, Prince Bảo Vang wrote a book titled Duy Tân, Empereur d'Annam 1900–1945 about his father's life.
Most cities in Vietnam have named major streets after him.

Family
1st wife: Mai Thị Vàng (1899–1980)
2nd wife: Marie Anne Viale (b. 1890)
Armand Viale (b. 1919)
3rd wife: Fermande Antier (b. 1913)
Thérèse (1928–1928)
Rita Suzy Georgette Vinh-San (1929–2020)
Solange (1930–1930)
Guy Georges Vinh-San (b. 1933)
Yves Claude Vinh-San (b. 1934)
Joseph Roger Vinh-San (b. 1938)
Ginette (1940–1940)
4th wife: Ernestine Yvette Maillot (b. 1924)
Andrée Maillot Vinh-San (1945–2011)

Images

References 

1900 births
1945 deaths
Child monarchs from Asia
Companions of the Liberation
Nguyen dynasty emperors
Free French military personnel of World War II
French Army officers
Military personnel of the Free French Naval Forces
Monarchs deposed as children
Victims of aviation accidents or incidents in 1945
Victims of aviation accidents or incidents in Africa
Vietnamese exiles
Vietnamese monarchs
Vietnamese nationalists
Vietnamese people of World War II
Vietnamese revolutionaries